Jane Fonda in Five Acts is a 2018 American documentary film, directed by Susan Lacy. It revolves around the life and career of Jane Fonda.

The film had its world premiere at the Sundance Film Festival on January 20, 2018. It was released on September 24, 2018, by HBO. The film was nominated for a Primetime Emmy Award for Outstanding Documentary or Nonfiction Special.

Synopsis
The film follows the life, career, and activism of Jane Fonda. Robert Redford, Lily Tomlin, Troy Garity, Paula Weinstein, Ted Turner, Sam Waterston, Malcolm and Vivian Valdim appear in the film.

Release
The film had its world premiere at the Sundance Film Festival on January 20, 2018. The film also screened at the Cannes Film Festival on May 10, 2018. It was released on September 24, 2018, by HBO.

Reception
Jane Fonda in Five Acts received positive reviews from film critics. The site's critical consensus reads, "Raw and rich in decade-spanning detail, Jane Fonda in Five Acts paints a living portrait of one popular culture's most compelling figures." On Metacritic, the film holds a rating of 87 out of 100, based on 8 critics, indicating "universal acclaim".

References

External links
 
 
 
 

2018 films
2018 documentary films
American documentary films
Biographical documentary films
Documentaries about war
Documentaries about politics
Documentaries about historical events
Documentary films about actors
HBO documentary films
2010s American films